The Council of State is an institution in Luxembourg that advises the national legislature, the Chamber of Deputies.  Until 1 January 1997, it was also the country's supreme administrative court, but this function was ceded to the newly created Administrative Tribunal and Administrative Court.

The Council of State was created by King-Grand Duke William III in the Coup of 1856.  It was originally entirely appointed by the Grand Duke, but this was changed in 1866, and, despite the roll-back of many changes brought about by the coup, the Council of State has otherwise remained.

Composition
The Council of State is composed of twenty-one councillors, who are appointed by the Grand Duke.  Of these, at least eleven must hold doctorates in law.  Neither number applies to members of the Grand Ducal Family, who may be appointed as additional members of the Council.  Membership is restricted to Luxembourgish nationals, who are resident in the Grand Duchy, are in possession of their full civil and political rights, and are at least 30 years old.  The final restriction does not apply to the heir to the Grand Duchy, who may be appointed upon being granted that title.

Current councillors
, the members of the Council of State are:

Footnotes

External links
 Council of State official website 

 
Organisations based in Luxembourg City
1856 establishments in Luxembourg